Paulo Jorge da Silva dos Santos (born 11 December 1972) is a Portuguese retired professional footballer who played as a goalkeeper.

He appeared in 275 Primeira Liga matches over 14 seasons, representing in the competition Benfica, Estrela da Amadora, Alverca, Porto, Varzim, Braga and Rio Ave.

Santos was part of the Portugal squad at the 2006 World Cup.

Club career
Born in Odivelas, Lisbon metropolitan area, Santos began his football career at age 11 at Sporting CP, and made his debut in the Primeira Liga in the 1993–94 season, winning the league with capital neighbours S.L. Benfica by playing one minute in the last game. After successful stints with C.F. Estrela da Amadora and F.C. Alverca, he went on to represent FC Porto, with no significant impact.

Santos joined S.C. Braga in summer 2005 after serving a loan stint with the same team the previous campaign. During that first year – with the Minho side finishing in fourth position in the league – when Andrés Madrid deflected the ball in for an own goal, he was beaten for the first time in 595 minutes, just 40 short of the record set by Benfica's Manuel Bento; in the only other time he had conceded during that season so far, Red Star Belgrade claimed the away goal that ended the Portuguese's campaign in the UEFA Cup at the first round for the second year running.

In 2007–08, mainly due to injury problems, Santos appeared in only 12 league matches. He was released in December 2008 following a contract dispute, although he had a link running until June 2009.

Midway through 2008–09, Santos spent time training with lowly Odivelas F.C. in the third division in order to stay fit. In July he "upgraded" to the second with G.D. Estoril Praia, appearing regularly to help his team retain their league status.

On 12 July 2010, at nearly 38, Santos moved to top-tier club Rio Ave FC, filling the gap left by the departure of starter Carlos Fernandes, who had moved to Bucaspor in Turkey. He retired two years later, having been first choice in his debut campaign.

International career
Santos won one cap for the Portugal national team, appearing in a friendly with Northern Ireland on 15 November 2005 (1–1 in Belfast). He was called up to the 2006 FIFA World Cup tournament, as a late replacement for the injured Bruno Vale.

During the group stage game against Guinea for the 1989 FIFA U-16 World Championship, Santos dropped his shorts to the crowd after being subjected to insults, being immediately suspended from the tournament and later banned by FIFA for one year.

Post-retirement
After retiring, Santos worked in the area of food supplements.

Honours
Benfica
Primeira Liga: 1993–94

Portugal
UEFA European Under-16 Championship: 1989

Individual
Primeira Liga Goalkeeper of the Year: 2006

Orders
Medal of Merit, Order of the Immaculate Conception of Vila Viçosa (House of Braganza)

References

External links

1972 births
Living people
People from Odivelas
Portuguese footballers
Footballers from Lisbon
Association football goalkeepers
Primeira Liga players
Liga Portugal 2 players
Segunda Divisão players
U.R. Mirense players
C.D. Olivais e Moscavide players
S.L. Benfica footballers
F.C. Penafiel players
C.F. Estrela da Amadora players
F.C. Alverca players
FC Porto players
FC Porto B players
Varzim S.C. players
S.C. Braga players
G.D. Estoril Praia players
Rio Ave F.C. players
Portugal youth international footballers
Portugal under-21 international footballers
Portugal international footballers
2006 FIFA World Cup players